Harold L. Richards High School is a co-ed Public high school located in Oak Lawn, Illinois, a suburb of Chicago, and is a member of Illinois school District 218.

The school opened in 1965, named for District Superintendent Dr. Harold Leland Richards who served in that capacity for 33 years from 1935-1968. Dr. Richards served as a private in the army in WWI, as a Major in the Army Air Corp in WWII, and eventually rose to Lt. Colonel in the Reserves and called back into active duty during the Korean War.  After graduating from Pennsylvania Military College in 1920, he taught in Indiana, was superintendent of Michigamme, Michigan schools, and headed the Iowa Military Academy in Epworth, Iowa before coming to District 218. In addition to PMC, he held multiple degrees from the University of Chicago. Dr. Richards died in January 1988 at the age of 88.

Demographics
The demographic breakdown of the 1,588 students enrolled for the 2020-2021 school year is as follows:

Male - 52.3%
Female - 47.7%
Native American/Alaskan - 0.4%
Asian/Pacific islander - 2%
Black - 24.1%
Hispanic - 25.1%
White - 30 %
Multiracial - 3.6%
Arabs- 30 %

Athletics/Clubs 
Richards competes in the South Suburban Conference (SSC) and is a member of the Illinois High School Association (IHSA), the body which governs most athletics and competitive activities in the state. Teams are stylized as the Bulldogs. The Athletic Director is Brian Wujcik and the Assistant Athletic Director is Sarah Ficaro.

The following Richards teams won or placed top four in their respective state championship tournaments sponsored by the IHSA:
 Basketball (Boys): State Champions (2007-08)
 Basketball (Girls): 4th Place (1985-86)
 Drama: 2nd Place (2014-15); 3rd Place (1990-91, 2008-09)
 Football: State Champions (1988-89, 1989-90); 2nd Place (2001-02, 2013-14)
 Softball: 2nd Place (1983-84)
 Track (Girls): 3rd Place (1972-73)
 Volleyball (Boys): State Champions (1991-92) 
 Volleyball (Girls): State Champions (1986-87)
 Wrestling: State Champions (1974-75, 1976-77); 2nd Place (1975-76); 3rd Place (1977-78)

Notable alumni 
 John Cox, Republican 2008 presidential candidate and 2018 California gubernatorial candidate.
 Dave Dombrowski, President of Baseball Operations for the Philadelphia Phillies
 Dwayne Goodrich, former defensive back of the Dallas Cowboys
 Mike Jones, former offensive lineman of the Chicago Bears
 John Kass - Chicago Tribune columnist
 Joe Montgomery, former NFL football player for the New York Giants
 Dwyane Wade, Former NBA player for the Miami Heat, co-owner of the Utah Jazz, 3x champion, and Olympic gold medalist

References

1965 establishments in Illinois
Educational institutions established in 1965
Oak Lawn, Illinois
Public high schools in Cook County, Illinois